Palatka Water Works is a former water pumping facility in Palatka, Florida. Built in 1886, this building provided residents with fresh water for more than 100 years. Today the building houses the Water Works Environmental Education Center. The center is used for educational school programs and community events. Trained volunteers from the St. Johns River Water Management District's Watershed Action Volunteer Program conduct programs for school children and adults to educate them about water resources, focusing on water conservation and protecting the St. Johns River.

References

External links
 Official Site

Palatka, Florida
Buildings and structures in Putnam County, Florida
Nature centers in Florida
Water supply pumping stations in the United States
Infrastructure completed in 1886
Education in Putnam County, Florida
Historic sites in Florida
Water in Florida
Tourist attractions in Palatka, Florida
National Register of Historic Places in Putnam County, Florida